Hijack is a 1973 American made-for-television action drama thriller film directed by Leonard Horn and starring David Janssen, Keenan Wynn and Lee Purcell.

Plot
Two desperate truck drivers, Jake and Donny, accept an assignment by a man named Kleiner to transport a "super important" cargo for $6,000. The men don't know what's in the cargo, but they find out that another group of men is willing to kill for the haul.  Throughout the trip, Jake and Donny are repeatedly attacked by the mercenaries, but the pair always manages to get past them, while also gradually eliminating the crooks one by one.  When they finally reach their destination, the enraged Jake breaks the lock on the trailer door and they find out that the trailer is loaded with nothing but burlap sacks filled with sand.  Kleiner reveals that the truck had merely been a decoy to cause the mercs to direct their attention to the wrong vehicle; the actual secret cargo had been quietly shipped the night before.

Cast
 David Janssen as Jake Wilkenson 
 Keenan Wynn as Donny McDonald 
 Lee Purcell as Eileen Noonan
 Jeanette Nolan as Mrs. Briscoe
 William Schallert as Frank Kleiner
 Tom Tully as Mr. Noonan
 Ron Feinberg as Bearded Man (as Ronald Feinberg)
 William Mims Highway Patrol Captain
 John A. Lee as Man With Glasses 
 Dalls Mitchell as Houston Dispatcher
 Morris Buchanan as L.A. Dispatcher
 Jim Burk as First Cowboy 
 Walter Wyatt as Second Cowboy (as Walt Wyatt) 
 James W. Gawin as Helicopter Pilot
 Robert Golden as Weigh Station Officer

Production
It was filmed in the Antelope Valley of California.

Reception
The Los Angeles Times said "if you miss it don't worry about it. You've probably seen it before."

See also
 List of American films of 1973

References

External links
 

ABC Movie of the Week
1973 television films
1973 films
Films shot in California
Films about hijackings
Films scored by Jack Elliott
Trucker films
Films directed by Leonard Horn